Timothy Mosley is a producer better known as Timbaland. This discography lists the recorded performances, writing and production credits as Timothy Mosley, as Timothy Zachery Mosley, as Timbaland or DJ Timmy Tim. Song names that are bold are singles, album names/releases are in italics.

Albums produced

1993

Jodeci - Diary Of A Mad Band 
(Tracks Produced With DeVante Swing)

 9. "In The Meanwhile" (featuring Timbaland)
 11. "Sweaty" (featuring Missy Elliott)

1994

Jodeci - What About Us (VLS) 
 What About Us featuring Magoo (Swing Mob Timbaland Remix)

Sista - 4 All The Sistas Around Da World 

 All tracks (produced With DeVante Swing)

1996

Aaliyah – One In A Million 

 1. Beats For Da Streets (Intro) (featuring Missy Elliott)
 2. Hot Like Fire (featuring Timbaland)
 3. "One In A Million"
 5. "If Your Girl Only Knew"
 8. "4 Page Letter"
 13. "Heartbroken"
 14. "Never Comin' Back"
 15. "Ladies In Da House" (featuring Timbaland and Missy Elliott)
 17. "Came To Give Love (Outro)" (featuring Timbaland)

Ginuwine - Ginuwine... The Bachelor 

 All tracks

1997

SWV - Release Some Tension 

 5. "Can We" (featuring Missy Elliott)

Missy Elliott - Supa Dupa Fly 

 All tracks

Various artists - Money Talks soundtrack 

 5. "Money Talks" (performed by Lil' Kim and Andrea Martin)

Timbaland & Magoo - Welcome To Our World 

 All tracks
 17. "Joy" (featuring Ginuwine and Playa) (produced with Smoke E. Digglera)

1998

Playa - Cheers 2 U 

 3. "All the Way"
 4. "Everybody Wanna Luv Somebody"
 8. "Cheers 2 U"
 9. "Ms. Parker" (featuring Missy Elliott)
 10. "Top of the World"
 12. "I'll B 2 C U"

Various artists - Dr. Dolittle soundtrack 

 3. "Are You That Somebody?" (performed by Aaliyah)
 4. "Same Ol' G" (performed by Ginuwine)
 6. "Da Funk" (performed by Timbaland)
 8. "Your Dress" (performed by Playa)

Nicole Wray - Make It Hot 

 6. "Make It Hot" (featuring Mocha and Missy Elliott)

Jay-Z - Vol. 2... Hard Knock Life 

 5. "Nigga What, Nigga Who (Originator 99)" (featuring Big Jaz)
 10. "Paper Chase" (featuring Foxy Brown)

Total - Kima, Keisha & Pam 

 1. "Trippin'" (produced with Missy Elliott, Darryl Pearson, Mario Winans, and Sean "Puffy" Combs)

Timbaland - Tim's Bio: Life from da Bassment 

 All tracks

1999

Ginuwine - 100% Ginuwine 

 1. "Little Kidz"
 2. "Little Man's Bangin Lude"
 3. "What's So Different?"
 4. "So Anxious"
 5. "None of Ur Friends Business"/"Interlude"
 6. "Wait a Minute"
 8. "Do You Remember"/"Interlude"
 9. "No. 1 Fan"
 10. "Final Warning"/"Interlude" (featuring Aaliyah)
 11. "I'm Crying Out"
 12. "Two Sides to a Story"
 13. "Same Ol' G"
 15. "Toe 2 Toe"

Various artists - The PJs soundtrack 

 2. "Talkin' Trash" (performed by Timbaland and Bassy)

Nas - I Am... 

 8. "You Won't See Me Tonight" (featuring Aaliyah)

Missy Elliott - Da Real World 

 All tracks

Nas - Nastradamus 

 14. "You Owe Me" (featuring Ginuwine)

Jay-Z - Vol. 3... Life & Times Of Shawn Carter 

 6. "It's Hot (Some Like It Hot)"
 7. "Snoopy Track" (featuring Juvenile)
 11. "Big Pimpin'" (featuring UGK)
 13. "Come and Get Me"

2000

The LOX - We Are the Streets 

 15. "Ryde or Die, Bitch" (featuring Timbaland and Eve)

Various artists - Romeo Must Die soundtrack 

 1. "Try Again" (performed by Aaliyah)
 5. "We At It Again" (performed by Timbaland & Magoo featuring Static Major & Sebastian)
 6. "Are You Feelin' Me?" (performed by Aaliyah)
 8. "Simply Irresistible" (performed by Ginuwine)

Da Brat - Unrestricted 

 1. "Intro" (featuring Millie Jackson and Twista)

Various artists - Nutty Professor II: The Klumps soundtrack 

 2. "Hey Papi" (performed by Jay-Z, Amil, and Memphis Bleek)

DJ Clue? - Backstage: Music Inspired by the Film 

 3. "In the Club" (performed by Beanie Sigel)

Mack 10 - The Paper Route 

 3. "Nobody" (featuring Westside Connection and Timbaland)

K-Ci & Jojo - X 

 5. "Game Face" (produced with Static Major)

Memphis Bleek - The Understanding 

 13. "Is That Your Chick (The Lost Verses)" (featuring Jay-Z, Twista and Missy Elliott)

Snoop Dogg - Tha Last Meal 

 3. "Snoop Dogg (What's My Name Pt. 2)"
 7. "Set It Off" (featuring MC Ren, The Lady of Rage, Ice Cube, Nate Dogg and Kurupt)

2001

Various artists - Exit Wounds soundtrack 

 14. "Hell Yeah (Remix)" (performed by Outsiderz 4 Life)

Ginuwine - The Life 

 9. "That's How I Get Down" (featuring Ludacris)
 19. "So Anxious (Timbaland's Anxiety Pt. 2)" (Limited Edition Bonus Track)

Various artists - Moulin Rouge! Music from Baz Luhrmann's Film 

 9. "Diamond Dogs" (performed by Beck)

Missy Elliott - Miss E... So Addictive 
(All tracks produced with Missy Elliott)

 2. "Dog in Heat" (featuring Method Man & Redman)
 3. "One Minute Man" (featuring Ludacris) (produced with Big Tank)
 4. "Lick Shots"
 5. "Get Ur Freak On"
 6. "Scream a.k.a. Itchin'" (featuring Timbaland)
 7. "Old School Joint"
 8. "Take Away" (featuring Ginuwine) (produced with Craig Brockman)
 9. "4 My People" (featuring Eve) (produced with Nisan Stewart and D-Man)
 10. "Bus-a-Bus" (Interlude) (featuring Busta Rhymes)
 11. "Whatcha Gon' Do" (featuring Timbaland)
 12. "Step Off"
 13. "X-Tasy"
 14. "Slap! Slap! Slap!" (featuring Da Brat & Jade)
 15. "I've Changed" (Interlude) (featuring Lil Mo)

Aaliyah - Aaliyah 

 1. "We Need a Resolution" (featuring Timbaland)
 4. "More Than a Woman"
 6. "I Care 4 U"

Jadakiss - Kiss Tha Game Goodbye 

 9. "Nasty Girl" (featuring Carl Thomas)

Fabolous - Ghetto Fabolous 

 8. "Right Now & Later On"

Jay-Z - The Blueprint 

 7. "Hola' Hovito"

Bubba Sparxxx - Dark Days, Bright Nights 

 1. "Take Off"
 2. "Ugly"
 4. "Bubba Talk"
 5. "Lovely"
 8. "Get Right"
 9. "Open Wide" (featuring Sebastian)
 11. "Twerk a Little" (featuring Timbaland)

Petey Pablo - Diary Of A Sinner: 1st Entry 

 3. "Raise Up"
 4. "I"
 5. "I Told Y'all"

Timbaland & Magoo - Indecent Proposal 

 All tracks
 8. "Voice Mail" (Interlude) (featuring Michelle Robinson) (produced with Craig Brockman)
 11. "Love Me" (featuring Tweet and Petey Pablo) (produced with Craig Brockman)

Ludacris - Word Of Mouf 

 2. "Rollout (My Business)"

Limp Bizkit - New Old Songs 

 2. "Take a Look Around" (featuring E-40 and 8-Ball)
 7. "Rearranged" (featuring Bubba Sparxxx)

Ruff Ryders - Ryde Or Die Vol. III: In The 'R' We Trust 

 3. "They Ain't Ready" (performed by Jadakiss and Bubba Sparxxx)

2002

Destiny's Child - This is the Remix 

 4. "Say My Name" (Timbaland Remix featuring Static Major)

Tweet - Southern Hummingbird 

 7. "Oops (Oh My)" (featuring Missy "Misdemeanor" Elliott)
 8. "Make Ur Move"
 13. "Call Me"
 16. "Sexual Healing (Oops Pt. 2)" (featuring Ms. Jade)

Truth Hurts - Truthfully Speaking 

 12. "Real"

Da Hood - Mack 10 Presents da Hood 

 13. "Life as a Gangsta" (featuring Birdman and TQ)
 14. "Nobody Hoo Bangin' Style" (featuring Timbaland)

Shade Sheist - Informal Introduction 

 8. "Money Owners" (featuring Timbaland)

Pastor Troy - Universal Soldier 

 3. "Are We Cuttin'" (featuring Ms. Jade)
 6. "Tell 'Em It's On" (featuring Timbaland)

TLC - 3D 

 9. "Dirty Dirty" (produced with Missy Elliott)

Justin Timberlake - Justified 
(All tracks produced with Scott Storch)

 3. "(Oh No) What You Got"
 5. "Cry Me a River"
 10. "(And She Said) Take Me Now"
 11. "Right for Me" (featuring Bubba Sparxxx)

Ms. Jade - Girl Interrupted 

 1. "Intro"
 2. "Jade's a Champ"
 3. "She's a Gangsta" (produced with Scott Storch)
 5. "Ching Ching" (featuring Timbaland and Nelly Furtado)
 6. "Get Away" (featuring Nesh)
 7. "Ching Ching, Pt. 2" (featuring Timbaland)
 8. "Step Up"
 9. "Interlude"
 10. "Count it Off" (featuring Jay-Z)
 11. "Really Don't Want My Love" (featuring Missy Elliott)
 12. "Dead Wrong" (featuring Nate Dogg)
 13. "Feel the Girl"
 14. "Big Head" (featuring Mary Malena and Timbaland)
 15. "Different"
 16. "Why U Tell Me That" (featuring Lil' Mo)

Jay-Z – The Blueprint 2: The Gift & The Curse 

 6. "What They Gonna Do" (featuring Sean Paul)
 10. "The Bounce" (featuring Kanye West) (produced with Kanye West)
 20. "2 Many Hoes"

Missy Elliott - Under Construction 
(All tracks produced with Missy Elliott)

 1. "Intro"/"Go to the Floor"
 2. "Bring the Pain" (featuring Method Man)
 3. "Gossip Folks" (featuring Ludacris)
 4. "Work It"
 5. "Back in the Day" (featuring Jay-Z)
 6. "Funky Fresh Dressed" (featuring Ms. Jade)
 9. "Slide"
 10. "Play that Beat"
 11. "Ain't that Funny"
 12. "Hot"

Birdman - Birdman 

 8. "Baby You Can Do It" (featuring Toni Braxton)

Aaliyah – I Care 4 U 

 6. "Don't Know What to Tell Ya"

Solange - Solo Star 

 4. "Get Together"

2003

Nate Dogg - Nate Dogg 

 8. "Gott Damn Shame" (featuring Timbaland and Ms. Jade)
 20. "Dead Wrong" (featuring Ms. Jade)

Lil' Kim - La Bella Mafia 

 8. "The Jump Off" (featuring Mr. Cheeks)

Mýa - Moodring 

 4. "Step" (produced with Mýa, Missy Elliott, and Ron Fair)

Zane - The Big Zane Theory 

 4. "Bounce"

Bubba Sparxxx - Deliverance 

 2. "Jimmy Mathis"
 3. "Comin' Round"
 4. "She Tried" (featuring Ryan Tedder)
 5. "Nowhere" (featuring Kiley Dean)
 6. "Overcome"
 7. "Warrant Interlude"
 8. "Warrant" (featuring Attitude)
 10. "Deliverance" (featuring Timbaland)
 11. "Hootnanny" (featuring Justin Timberlake)
 12. "Take a Load Off"
 14. "My Tone"

Obie Trice - Cheers 

 7. "Bad Bitch" (featuring Timbaland)

Jay-Z - The Black Album 

 6. "Dirt off Your Shoulder"

Timbaland & Magoo - Under Construction Part II 

 1. "Straight Outta Virginia" (Intro)
 2. "Cop That Shit" (featuring Missy Elliott)
 3. "Shenanigans" (featuring Bubba Sparxxx)
 4. "Leavin'" (featuring Attitude)
 5. "That Shit Ain't Gonna Work"
 7. "Indian Flute" (featuring Sebastian and Rajé Shwari)
 8. "Can We Do It Again"
 9. "Naughty Eye" (featuring Sebastian and Raje Shwari)
 10. "N 2 Da Music" (featuring Brandy)
 11. "Hold On" (featuring Wyclef Jean)
 12. "Insane" (featuring Candice "Gg" Nelson)
 13. "Throwback"
 14. "Kold Kutz"
 16. "Naughty Eye II (Hips)" (featuring Beenie Man)

Missy Elliott - This Is Not A Test! 
(All tracks produced with Missy Elliott)

 1. "Baby Girl Interlude/Intro" (featuring Mary J. Blige)
 2. "Bomb Intro/Pass That Dutch"
 3. "Wake Up" (featuring Jay-Z)
 4. "Keep It Movin'" (featuring Elephant Man)
 6. "Ragtime Interlude/I'm Really Hot"
 8. "Don't Be Cruel" (featuring Monica and Beenie Man)
 9. "Toyz Interlude/Toyz"
 10. "Let It Bump"
 11. "Pump It Up" (featuring Nelly)
 13. "Let Me Fix My Weave"
 14. "Spelling Bee Interlude/Spelling Bee"
 16. "Outro" (featuring Mary J. Blige)

Alicia Keys - The Diary Of Alicia Keys 

 3. "Heartburn" (produced with Alicia Keys)

2004

Cee-Lo Green - Cee-Lo Green... Is the Soul Machine 

 5. "I'll Be Around" (featuring Timbaland)

Knoc-Turn'al - The Way I Am 

 14. "Have Fun"

Petey Pablo - Still Writing in My Diary: 2nd Entry 

 8. "Get on Dis Motorcycle" (featuring Bubba Sparxxx) (produced with Scott Storch)
 9. "Break Me Off" (featuring Missy Elliott)

Brandy - Afrodisiac 
(All tracks produced with Brandy)

 2. "Afrodisiac"
 3. "Who Is She 2 U"
 5. "I Tried"
 7. "Focus"
 8. "Sadiddy"
 9. "Turn It Up"
 12. "Come as You Are"
 13. "Finally"
 15. "Should I Go"
 16. "Nodding Off"

Lloyd Banks - The Hunger For More 

 6. "I'm So Fly" (produced with Danja)

Beenie Man - Back to Basics 

 11. "All Girls Party"

LL Cool J - The DEFinition 

 1. "Headsprung"
 2. "Rub My Back"
 6. "Every Sip" (featuring Candance Nelson)
 8. "Can't Explain It"
 9. "Feel the Beat"
 10. "Apple Cobbler"

Utada Hikaru - Exodus 

 3. "Exodus '04"
 12. "Wonder 'Bout"
 13. "Let Me Give You My Love"

Various artists - Shark Tale soundtrack 

 3. "Good Foot" (Justin Timberlake featuring Timbaland)

Shawnna - Worth tha Weight 

 5. "Shake Dat Shit" (featuring Ludacris)

Jacki-O - Poe Little Rich Girl 

 7. "Slow Down"

Ludacris - The Red Light District 

 1. "Intro"
 7. "The Potion"

Xzibit - Weapons of Mass Destruction 

 9. "Hey Now (Mean Muggin)" (featuring Keri Hilson)

2005

The Game - The Documentary 

 9. "Put You on the Game" (produced with Danja)

Jennifer Lopez - Rebirth 

 10. "He'll Be Back" (produced with Danja and Cory Rooney)

Tweet - It's Me Again 

 13. "Steer" (produced with Missy Elliott, Nisan Stewart, and Charlie Bereal)

Various artists - xXx: State of the Union soundtrack 

 9. "Here We Go" (performed by Dirtbag)

The Black Eyed Peas - Monkey Business 

 3. "My Style" (featuring Justin Timberlake and Timbaland) (produced with Danja)

Fat Joe - All Or Nothing 

 11. "Everybody Get Up"

Missy Elliott - The Cookbook 
(Tracks produced with Missy Elliott)

 1. "Joy" (featuring Mike Jones)
 2. "Partytime"

The Pussycat Dolls - PCD 

 3. "Wait a Minute" (featuring Timbaland) (produced with Keri Hilson and Ron Fair)

Ray J - Raydiation 

 11. "Unbelievable" (featuring Gangsta Girl, Detail and Shorty Mack)

Jamie Foxx - Unpredictable 

 5. "Can I Take U Home"  (produced with Static Major)

2006

Bubba Sparxxx - The Charm 

 11. "Hey! (A Lil' Gratitude)"

Nelly Furtado - Loose 
(All tracks produced with Danja and Jim Beanz)

 1. "Afraid" (featuring Attitude)
 2. "Maneater"
 3. "Promiscuous" (featuring Timbaland)
 4. "Glow"
 6. "No Hay Igual" (produced with Nisan Stewart)
 8. "Say It Right"
 9. "Do It"
 11. "Wait for You"
 12. "All Good Things (Come to an End)"

Busta Rhymes - The Big Bang 

 13. "Get Down" (produced with Nisan Stewart)

Danity Kane - Danity Kane 
(Tracks produced with Danja)

 3. "Want It"
 4. "Right Now"

Justin Timberlake - FutureSex/LoveSounds 
(All tracks produced with Justin Timberlake and Danja)

 1. "FutureSex/LoveSound"
 2. "SexyBack"
 3. "Sexy Ladies / Let Me Talk to You (Prelude)"
 4. "My Love" (featuring T.I.)
 5. "LoveStoned / I Think She Knows (Interlude)"
 6. "What Goes Around... / ...Comes Around (Interlude)"
 7. "Chop Me Up" (featuring Timbaland and Three 6 Mafia)
 9. "Summer Love / Set the Mood (Prelude)"
 10. "Until the End of Time"
 11. "Losing My Way"

Chingy - Hoodstar 

 12. "Let Me Luv Uaturing Keri Hilson)

Diddy - Press Play 

 14. "After Love" (featuring Keri Hilson) (produced with Danja)

Snoop Dogg - Tha Blue Carpet Treatment 

 7. "Get a Light" (featuring Damian Marley) (produced with Danja)

Young Jeezy - The Inspiration 

 7. "3 A.M." (featuring Timbaland)

Omarion - 21 
(Tracks produced with The Royal Court)

 2. "Ice Box" (featuring Timbaland)
 9. "Beg for It"

2007

Britney Spears - Blackout 

 10. "Ooh Ooh Baby"

Timbaland - Timbaland Presents Shock Value 

 1. "Oh Timbaland"
 2. "Give It to Me" (featuring Nelly Furtado and Justin Timberlake) (produced with Danja)
 3. "Release" (featuring Justin Timberlake)
 4. "The Way I Are" (featuring Keri Hilson and D.O.E.) (produced with Danja)
 5. "Bounce" (featuring Dr. Dre, Missy Elliott and Justin Timberlake)
 6. "Come and Get Me" (featuring 50 Cent and Tony Yayo) (produced with Danja)
 7. "Kill Yourself" (featuring Sebastian and Attitude)
 8. "Boardmeeting" (featuring Magoo) (produced with Danja)
 10. "Scream" (featuring Keri Hilson and Nicole Scherzinger) (produced with Danja)
 12. "Bombay" (featuring Amar and Jim Beanz)
 13. "Throw It on Me" (featuring The Hives)
 14. "Time" (featuring She Wants Revenge)
 15. "One and Only" (featuring Fall Out Boy) (produced with Hannon Lane)
 16. "Apologize" (featuring OneRepublic) (produced with Greg Wells and Ryan Tedder)
 17. "2 Man Show" (featuring Elton John) 
 18. "Hello" (featuring Keri Hilson and Attitude)
 19. "Come Around" (featuring M.I.A.) (produced with Jim Beanz)

Redman - Red Gone Wild: Thee Album 

 3. "Put It Down"

Björk - Volta 
(Tracks produced with Bjork and Danja)

 1. "Earth Intruders"
 4. "Innocence"

Bobby Valentino - Special Occasion 
(Tracks produced with J-Roc and King Logan)

 2. "Anonymous" (featuring Timbaland)
 5. "Rearview (Ridin')" (featuring Ludacris)

Tank - Sex, Love & Pain 

 12. "I Love Them Girls" (Timbaland Remix)

Rihanna - Good Girl Gone Bad 

 8. "Sell Me Candy" (produced with Makeba Riddick and The-Dream)
 9. "Lemme Get That" (produced with The-Dream)
 10. "Rehab" (produced with Hannon Lane and Justin Timberlake)

Fabolous - From Nothin' To Somethin' 

 4. "Make Me Better" (featuring Ne-Yo)

M.I.A. - Kala 

 12. "Come Around" (featuring Timbaland) (produced with M.I.A.)

50 Cent - Curtis 

 7. "Ayo Technology" (featuring Justin Timberlake and Timbaland) (produced with Danja)

Cheri Dennis - In & Out Of Love 

 11. "Act Like You Know"

Duran Duran - Red Carpet Massacre 

 3. "Nite-Runner" (produced with Duran Duran, Justin Timberlake and Danja)
 6. "Skin Divers" (produced with Duran Duran and Danja)
 9. "Zoom In" (produced with Duran Duran and Danja)

Mario - Go 

 7. "No Definition" (produced with J-Roc and King Logan)

2008

Various artists - Step Up 2: The Streets soundtrack 

 2. "Shake Your Pom Pom" (performed by Missy Elliott)

Flo Rida - Mail On Sunday 

 3. "Elevator" (featuring Timbaland) (produced with Hannon Lane)

M. Pokora - MP3 

 1. "Dangerous" (featuring Timbaland & Sebastian)
 2. "Catch me if you can"
 4. "No me without u"
 12. "Why do you cry?" (produced with Jim Beanz)
 13. "Like a criminal"

Ashlee Simpson - Bittersweet World 
(All tracks produced with King Logan, J-Roc, and Jim Beanz)

 1. "Outta My Head (Ay Ya Ya)" 
 3. "Rule Breaker"
 6. "Ragdoll" (produced with Kenna)
 7. "Bittersweet World"
 8. "What I've Become" (produced with Demacio "Demo" Castellon)
 10. "Murder"

Madonna - Hard Candy 
(All tracks produced with Justin Timberlake)

 2. "4 Minutes" (featuring Justin Timberlake and Timbaland) (produced with Danja)
 5. "Miles Away" (produced with Danja)
 9. "Dance 2Night" (produced with Hannon Lane and Demacio "Demo" Castellon)
 11. "Devil Wouldn't Recognize You" (produced with Danja)
 12. "Voices" (produced with Danja and Hannon Lane)

New Kids On The Block - The Block 

9. "Twisted" (produced with J-Roc)

The Pussycat Dolls - Doll Domination 
(All tracks produced with J-Roc)

 9. "Magic"
 10. "Halo"
 11. "In Person"
 15. "Whatchamacallit"

Jennifer Hudson - Jennifer Hudson 

 3. "Pocketbook" (featuring Ludacris) (produced with Jim Beanz)

Jamie Foxx - Intuition 

 2. "I Don't Need It" (featuring Timbaland)

2009

Chris Cornell - Scream 

 All tracks (produced with J-Roc)
 10. "Enemy" (produced with The Royal Court)

Keri Hilson - In A Perfect World... 

 4. "Return the Favor" (featuring Timbaland) (produced with Walter Milsap)
 8. "Intuition" (produced with Danja and Keri Hilson)
 9. "How Does It Feel" (produced with Danja, Keri Hilson and Jim Beanz)
 14. "Where Did He Go" (produced with Danja and Keri Hilson)

Ginuwine - A Man's Thoughts 

 8. "Get Involved" (featuring Missy Elliott and Timbaland) (produced with J-Roc)

Jay-Z - The Blueprint 3 

 8. "Off That" (featuring Drake)
 10. "Venus vs. Mars"
 13. "Reminder"

Shakira - She Wolf 

 13. "Give It Up to Me" (featuring Lil Wayne) (produced with J-Roc)

Wyclef Jean - From The Hut, To The Projects, To The Mansion 

 7. "More Bottles" (featuring Timbaland)

Birdman - Priceless 

 5. "Pricele$$" (featuring Lil Wayne)

Timbaland - Timbaland Presents Shock Value II 

 All tracks
 2. "Carry Out" (featuring Justin Timberlake) (produced with J-Roc)
 3. "Lose Control" (featuring JoJo) (produced with J-Roc)
 4. "Meet in tha Middle" (featuring Bran' Nu) (produced with Polow da Don)
 5. "Say Something" (featuring Drake) (produced with J-Roc)
 6. "Tomorrow in the Bottle" (featuring Chad Kroeger and Sebastian) (produced with J-Roc and Wizz Dumb)
 7. "We Belong to the Music" (featuring Miley Cyrus) (produced with J-Roc)
 8. "Morning After Dark" (featuring Nelly Furtado and SoShy) (produced with J-Roc)
 9. "If We Ever Meet Again" (featuring Katy Perry) (produced with Jim Beanz)
 10. "Can You Feel It" (featuring Esthero and Sebastian) (produced with J-Roc)
 11. "Ease Off the Liquor" (featuring Melody Thornton) (produced with J-Roc)
 12. "Undertow" (featuring The Fray and Esthero) (produced with The Fray)
 13. "Timothy Where You Been" (featuring Jet) (produced with J-Roc)
 14. "Long Way Down" (featuring Daughtry) (produced with J-Roc)
 15. "Marchin On (Timbo Version)" (featuring OneRepublic) (produced with Ryan Tedder)
 16. "The One I Love" (featuring Keri Hilson and D.O.E.) (produced with J-Roc)
 17. "Symphony" (featuring Attitude, Bran' Nu and D.O.E.) (produced with J-Roc)

Keri Hilson - No Boys Allowed 
(Tracks produced with J-Roc)

 8. "Breaking Point"
 9. "Beautiful Mistake"
 14. "Lie to Me" (featuring Timbaland) (produced with J-Mizzle)
 15. "Won't Be Long" (featuring Timbaland) (produced with J-Mizzle)
 17. "Drippin'"

Keyshia Cole - Calling All Hearts 

 9. "Last Hangover" (featuring Timbaland)

2010

Drake - Thank Me Later 

 14. "Thank Me Now"

2011

Game - Purp & Patron (The Hangover) 

 7. "Get Familiar" (featuring Timbaland)

Chris Brown - F.A.M.E. 

 16. "Paper, Scissors, Rock" (featuring Timbaland and Big Sean) (produced with J-Roc)
 18. "Talk Ya Ear Off"

Various artists - Step Up Revolution: Music from the Motion Picture 

 3. "Hands in the Air" (performed by Timbaland featuring Ne-Yo)

Lil Wayne - Tha Carter IV 

 19. "Up Up and Away" (produced with Wizz Dumb)

Demi Lovato - Unbroken 
(All tracks produced with Jim Beanz)

 1. "All Night Long" (featuring Missy Elliott and Timbaland) (produced with J-Roc)
 4. "Together" (featuring Jason Derulo)
 5. "Lightweight"

Various artists -  October 7 

 8. "Give It a Go" (performed by Veronica)

Short Dawg - The Adventures Of Drankenstein 

 3. "Bone" (featuring Z-Ro)
 14. "All Y'all" (featuring Timbaland and Attitude)

Lyrica Anderson - King Me 

 11. "Vampire" (featuring Timbaland)

2012

Timati - SWAGG 

 2. "Not All About the Money" (with La La Land featuring Timbaland and Grooya)

2013

Justin Timberlake - The 20/20 Experience 

 All tracks (produced with Justin Timberlake and J-Roc)

Jay-Z - Magna Carta... Holy Grail 

 1. "Holy Grail" (featuring Justin Timberlake) (produced with The-Dream, J-Roc, and No I.D.)
 2. "Picasso Baby" (produced with J-Roc)
 3. "Tom Ford" (produced with J-Roc)
 4. "Fuckwithmeyouknowigotit" (featuring Rick Ross) (produced with Boi-1da, Vinylz, and J-Roc)
 5. "Oceans" (featuring Frank Ocean) (produced with Pharrell)
 6. "F.U.T.W." (produced with J-Roc)
 9. "Heaven" (produced with J-Roc)
 10. "Versus" (produced with Swizz Beatz)
 11. "Part II (On the Run)" (featuring Beyoncé) (produced with J-Roc)
 14. "JAY Z Blue" (produced with J-Roc and Justin Timberlake)
 15. "La Familia" (produced with J-Roc)
 17. "Open Letter" (produced with Swizz Beatz and J-Roc)

Juicy J - Stay Trippy 

 10. "The Woods" (featuring Justin Timberlake and Timbaland)

Cher - Closer To The Truth 

 12. "I Don't Have to Sleep to Dream" (produced with J-Roc and Ivan Corraliza)

Justin Timberlake - The 20/20 Experience 2 Of 2 

 All tracks (produced with Justin Timberlake and J-Roc)
 3. "Cabaret" (featuring Drake) (produced with Daniel Jones)
 9. "Amnesia" (produced with Daniel Jones)

DJ Khaled - Suffering From Success 

 4. "You Don't Want These Problems" (featuring Big Sean, Rick Ross, French Montana, 2 Chainz, Meek Mill, Ace Hood and Timbaland) (produced with DJ Khaled, DJ Nasty & LVM, and Lee on the Beats)

Dido - Greatest Hits 

 4. "White Flag" (Timbaland Remix)

Beyoncé - Beyoncé 
(All tracks produced with Beyoncé and J-Roc)

 3. "Drunk in Love" (featuring Jay-Z) (produced with Detail, The Order, and BOOTS)
 4. "Blow" (produced with Pharrell)
 6. "Partition" (produced with Justin Timberlake, Key Wane, BOOTS, and Mike Dean)
 8. "Rocket"

2014

Brasco - 18th Floor Thompson Hotel Edition 

 5. "Big Spenda" (featuring Pusha T and Timbaland)
 12. "6 Figures"

Rick Ross - Mastermind 

 19. "You Know I Got It (Reprise)" (produced with Boi-1da, Vinylz, and J-Roc)

Jason Derulo - Talk Dirty 

 4. "Bubblegum" (featuring Tyga) (produced with Jim Beanz)

Michael Jackson - Xscape 
(All tracks produced with J-Roc)

 2. "Chicago" (produced with Cory Rooney)
 3. "Loving You" (produced with Michael Jackson)
 5. "Slave to the Rhythm" (produced with L.A. Reid and Babyface)
 6. "Do You Know Where Your Children Are" (produced with Michael Jackson)
 7. "Blue Gangsta" (produced with King Logan, Daniel Jones, and Dr. Freeze)

Emerson Windy - Herojuana 

 2. "Come Get It" (featuring Pusha T) (produced with Jazzfeezy)

Karl Wolf - Stereotype 

 3. "Magic Hotel" (featuring Timbaland and Brasco)

Jennifer Hudson - JHUD 

 4. "Walk It Out" (featuring Timbaland) (produced with J-Roc and Jim Beanz)

Rick Ross - Hood Billionaire 

 9. "Movin’ Bass" (featuring Jay Z) (produced with J-Roc)
 10. "If They Knew" (featuring K. Michelle)

2015

Jodeci - The Past, The Present, The Future 
(Tracks produced with DeVante Swing)

 4. "Those Things"
 7. "Incredible"

Bryson Tiller - Trapsoul 

 11. "Sorry Not Sorry" (produced with Milli Beatz)
 12. "Been That Way" (produced with Fade MaJah)

Monica - Code Red 

 3. "Love Just Ain't Enough" (featuring Timbaland) (produced with Jonathan Solone-Myvett and Nick Brongers)
 4. "Call My Name" (produced with Polow da Don and Daniel Jones)
 6. "All Men Lie" (featuring Timbaland) (produced with Nick Brongers)

Pusha T - King Push – Darkest Before Dawn: The Prelude 

 2. "Untouchable" (produced with Milli Beatz)
 6. "Got Em Covered" (featuring Ab-Liva) (produced with Milli Beatz)
 8. "Retribution" (featuring Kehlani) (produced with Deafh Beats)

Timbaland - King Stays King 

 All tracks
 1. "Get No Betta" (featuring Mila J) (produced with Kaui)
 2. "Shakin" (featuring Aaliyah) (produced with Strato)
 3. "Dem Jeans" (featuring Migos) (produced with Milli Beatz)
 4. "Frenemies" (featuring Tink and Myari) (produced with Fade MaJah)
 5. "Tables Turn" (featuring Obsessed and Tink) (produced with Fade MaJah)
 6. "Servin" (featuring Blaze and Tweezie) (produced with Milli Beatz)
 7. "Smile On Yo Face" (featuring Yo Gotti) (produced with Milli Beatz)
 8. "Didn't Do It" (featuring Young Thug) (produced with Milli Beatz)
 9. "Callin And Callin" (featuring Young Crazy and Breeze Barker) (produced with Milli Beatz)
 10. "Where You At?" (featuring Blaze Serving) (produced with Milli Beatz)
 11. "Shawty" (featuring Rich Homie Quan) (produced with Milli Beatz)
 12. "This Me, Fuck It" (featuring 2 Chainz) (produced with Milli Beatz)
 14. "Drama Queen" (featuring Tink) (produced with Milli Beatz)
 15. "Go Ahead (Boo Boo Kitty)" (featuring Wedding Crashers, Goldy, and Cynthia) (produced with Milli Beatz)
 16. "Drug Dealer" (featuring Rico Richie) (produced with Milli Beatz)
 17. "You Held It Down" (featuring Bankroll and Obsessed) (produced with Milli Beatz)

2016

Rihanna - ANTI 

 8. "Yeah, I Said It" (produced with Fade MaJah and Daniel Jones)

Yo Gotti - The Art Of Hustle 

 6. "Smile" (featuring Timbaland) (produced with Milli Beatz)

Tweet - Charelene 

 6. "Somebody Else Will" (featuring Missy Elliott)

Snoop Dogg - Coolaid 

 17. "Got Those"

Various artists - Trolls soundtrack 

 11. "September" (performed by Justin Timberlake, Anna Kendrick, and Earth, Wind & Fire) (produced with Justin Timberlake and Earth, Wind & Fire)

2017

Brad Paisley - Love & War 

 10. "Grey Goose Chase" (featuring Timbaland)
 13. "Solar Power Girl" (featuring Timbaland)

Sam Smith - The Thrill of It All 

 10. "Pray"

2018

Justin Timberlake - Man Of The Woods 
(All tracks produced with Justin Timberlake)

 1. "Filthy" (produced with Danja)
 9. "Say Something" (featuring Chris Stapleton) (produced with Danja and Rance Dopson)
 16. "Young Man" (produced with J-Roc)

Ski Mask the Slump God - You Will Regret 

 1. "Catch Me Outside"

Maluma - F.A.M.E. 

 6. "Mi Declaración" (featuring Timbaland and Sid) (produced with Rance, Edge, and Angel Lopez)

Various artists - Uncle Drew soundtrack 

 14. "What's the Play" (performed by Wiz Khalifa)

Little Mix - LM5 

 11. "More than Words" (featuring Kamille) (produced with Angel Lopez, Federico Vindver, Rance, and Joe Kearns)

Mariah Carey - Caution 

 8. "8th Grade" (produced with Mariah Carey, Poo Bear, Angel Lopez, Federico Vindver, and Rance)

Zayn - Icarus Falls 

 27. "Too Much" (featuring Timbaland) (produced with Angel Lopez and Federico Vindver)

2019

Tee Grizzley - Scriptures 
(All tracks produced with Angel Lopez and Federico Vindver)

 1. "Scriptures / Intro" (produced with Shucati and Lazlow 808)
 2. "Sweet Thangs" (produced with Shucati and Bastian Völkel)
 3. "Heroes" (produced with Keanu Beats and Hunnid)
 5. "Had To" (produced with Keanu Beats and Cosa Nostra Beats)
 6. "Locksmith"
 7. "Gods Warriors" (produced with Keanu Beats and Ambezza)
 10. "More Than Friends" (produced with Shucati)
 12. "Million Dollar Foreign" (produced with Keanu Beats and SCXTT)

Chance The Rapper - The Big Day 

 12. "Big Fish" (featuring Gucci Mane) (produced with Chance the Rapper, TrapMoneyBenny, Angel Lopez, and Federico Vindver)

A$AP Ferg - Floor Seats 

 "Hummer Limo" (produced with Angel Lopez and Federico Vindver)

Missy Elliott - Iconology 

 3. "DripDemeanor" (produced with Missy Elliott)
 4. "Why I Still Love You" (produced with Angel Lopez and Federico Vindver)

Kanye West - Jesus Is King 
(All tracks produced with Kanye West, Angel Lopez, and Federico Vindver)

 4. "Closed on Sunday" (produced with Brian "AllDay" Miller)
 7. "Water" (featuring Ant Clemons) (produced with BoogzDaBeast)
 9. "Hands On" (featuring Fred Hammond)
 10. "Use This Gospel" (featuring Clipse and Kenny G) (produced with DrtWrk, BoogzDaBeast, and Pi'erre Bourne)
 11. "Jesus Is Lord" (produced with Brian "AllDay" Miller)

Dave East - Survival 

 6. "Seventeen" (produced with Shucati and Mike Kuz)

2020

Ant Clemons - Happy 2 Be Here 

 2. "4 Letter Word" (featuring Timbaland)

Megan Thee Stallion - Suga 

 9. "What I Need" (produced with J Tabb)

Joyner Lucas - ADHD 

 12. "10 Bands" (featuring Timbaland)

RMR - Drug Dealing Is a Lost Art 

 4. "I'm Not Over You" (produced with Andre Brissett)

Teyana Taylor - The Album 

 8. "Boomin" (featuring Missy Elliott and Future) (produced with Teyana Taylor, DJ Camper, Angel Lopez, Federico Vindver, Jordan Mosley, and Justin Mosley)

6lack - 6pc Hot EP 

 5. "Elephant in the Room" (produced with Battlecat, Rance, and Brody Brown)

Burna Boy - Twice as Tall 

 1. "Level Up" (featuring Youssou N'Dour) (produced with Matt Testa, DJDS, and Matthew Baus)
 2. "Alarm Clock" (produced with Diddy and P2J)
 3. "Way Too Big" (produced with Diddy, Mike Dean, and LeriQ)
 13. "Wetin Dey Sup" (produced with Telz)

2021

J. Cole - The Off-Season 

 2. "Amari" (produced with Sucuki, J. Cole, and T-Minus)

Justine Skye - Space and Time 

 6. "Innocent" (featuring Justin Timberlake)

Lauren Jauregui - PRELUDE 

 4. "Falling" (produced with Angel Lopez, Federico Vindver, and Justus West)

2022

Jack Harlow - Come Home the Kids Miss You 

 9. "I Got a Shot" (produced with Jack Harlow, Boi-1da, JetsonMade, Chahayed, Frankie Bash, BabeTruth, Charlie Handsome, Jasper Harris, Nemo Achida, Foreign Teck, Wincorn, and Clay Harlow)
 12. "Parent Trap" (produced with Jack Harlow, Chahayed, BabeTruth, Wallis Lane, 2forWoyne, and Mikewavvs)

The Game - Drillmatic – Heart vs. Mind 

 17. "Fortunate" (featuring Kanye West, Dreezy and Chiller) (produced with Tobias Wincorn)
 26. ".38 Special" (featuring Blueface) (produced with Derek Kastal and MTK)

References 

Production discographies
Production discography
Discographies of American artists
 
 
Hip hop discographies
Pop music discographies